Christian Schools International (CSI) is a nonprofit education organization and was established in 1920. Christian Schools International provides services to Protestant schools in accreditation, curriculum and instruction, employee benefits (insurance and retirement plans), and leadership development. They also have a published Bible and science curriculum for Protestant schools seeking Bible-based textbooks for their classrooms.

Christian Schools International's mission is to advance Protestant education and to support schools in their task of teaching students to know God and his world and to glorify him through obedient service.

The organization includes nearly 500 Christian schools in the United States and Canada, which employ approximately 10,000 teachers and enroll 100,000 students.

External links
Christian Schools International

Christian educational organizations
Private and independent school organizations